The National Fire Agency (NFA) is the central administrative agency of the Republic of Korea that administers firefighting affairs. The NFA was created on June 27, 2017 by an Amendment to the Government Organization Act . 

The NFA's primary purpose is to comprehensively respond to any accidents or disasters n the country. It has tightened the national disaster response system by supplementing the existing firefighting workforce and equipment and strengthening the teams working primarily on site. 

The current Fire Commissioner is Jeong Moon-Ho.

Organization
 Fire Commissioner
 Spokesperson
 Vice-Commissioner
 General Affairs Division
 Planning & Coordination Bureau
 Planning & Budget Division
 Administrative, Legal Affairs & Audit Division
 Info & Statistics Division
 Fire Policy Bureau
 Fire Policy Division
 Fire Prevention Division
 Fire Response & Investigation Division
 Fire Industry Division
 119 Rescue & EMS Bureau
 119 Rescue Division
 119 EMS Division
 119 Daily Life Safety Division
 Fire Equipment & Aviation Division

References

External links
 
 National Fire Agency
 National Fire Agency 
 
 

Government agencies of South Korea
2017 establishments in South Korea
Fire and rescue in South Korea